The Macdonald Bluffs are prominent east-facing bluffs between Argosy Glacier and Argo Glacier in the Miller Range of Antarctica, descending to Marsh Glacier. The feature was mapped by the New Zealand Southern Party of the Commonwealth Trans-Antarctic Expedition (1956–58) and named for W.J.P. Macdonald, an International Geophysical Year scientist at Scott Base in 1957.

See also
Dike Cirque

References

Cliffs of Oates Land